The underground station Meßberg is located in the city centre of Hamburg, Germany in the Altstadt quarter. It is served by the rapid transit trains of the line U1 of the Hamburg U-Bahn. The station is managed by the Hamburger Hochbahn, the operator of the underground railway.

History
In March 1894, the first electric tram line in Hamburg served an at grade stop Meßberg. On , the construction of the 0.7 km long tunnel-line from Jungfernstieg station to the new underground station Meßberg was finished, it was the first new construction of an underground rail line in Hamburg after 24 years. On  the tunnel to the newly built underground station “Central Station” was completed.

Service
The trains of the line U1 from Norderstedt to Ohlstedt / Großhansdorf are calling the station.

See also 
 Hamburger Verkehrsverbund (Public transport association in Hamburg)

References

External links 

Hamburg U-Bahn stations in Hamburg
U1 (Hamburg U-Bahn) stations
Buildings and structures in Hamburg-Mitte
Railway stations in Germany opened in 1960
1960 establishments in West Germany